Myrsine ceylanica is plant species in the family Primulaceae.

References

ceylanica
Taxonomy articles created by Polbot
Taxobox binomials not recognized by IUCN